James Christopher O'Sullivan (born May 1986) is an Irish writer, publisher, editor, and academic from Cork city. He is a university lecturer, the founding editor of New Binary Press, and the writer of three collections of poetry.

Career

Academia

O'Sullivan is involved in the study of Digital Humanities, and has an interest in computer-assisted text analysis and new media studies. He has held faculty positions at institutions such as Pennsylvania State University and the University of Sheffield. As of 2017, he was a lecturer at University College Cork, part of the National University of Ireland.

In 2019 he published Towards a Digital Poetics: Electronic Literature & Literary Games (Palgrave Macmillan 2019). He has edited several academic volumes, including Reading Modernism with Machines (Palgrave Macmillan 2016).

He contributed to The Bloomsbury Handbook of Electronic Literature edited by Joseph Tabbi which received the 2018 N. Katherine Hayles Award for Criticism from the Electronic Literature Organization. He was shortlisted for the Fortier Prize for Digital Humanities research in 2014. 

O'Sullivan has published scholarly papers and essays in a number of peer-reviewed academic journals and books, including Digital Scholarship in the Humanities (Oxford University Press), Leonardo (The MIT Press), Digital Humanities Quarterly, the International Journal of Humanities and Arts Computing (Edinburgh University Press), Digital Studies/Le Champ Numérique, and Literary Studies in the Digital Age (Modern Language Association). 

His various uses of stylometry to analyse the work of James Patterson have garnered media attention, including being cited by Anthony Lane in The New Yorker.  O'Sullivan has contributed to a number of digital resources, including Zebrapedia, a project seeking to transcribe the entirety of Philip K. Dick's Exegesis. He chaired the 2019 Electronic Literature Organization Conference & Media Arts Festival, the first time the annual gathering of new media scholars and practitioners was hosted in Ireland. 

He is former Associate Director of the Digital Humanities Summer Institute at the University of Victoria, British Columbia.

In 2018, O'Sullivan publicly criticised Irish universities for focusing too much on commercially oriented "skills" to the detriment of critical thinking. He has also claimed that many Irish academics are working class.

Publishing

O'Sullivan founded New Binary Press in 2012, a publishing house dedicated to the publication of both print and electronic literature. New Binary Press has published the works of authors such as Nick Montfort and Karl Parkinson. Successes for the publishing house have include Graham Allen's The One That Got Away which was shortlisted for the Shine/Strong Award 2015, while Unexplained Fevers by Jeannine Hall Gailey came second in the 2014 Science Fiction Poetry Association's Elgin Award. 

In early 2017, in an interview with Books Ireland magazine, O'Sullivan said that New Binary Press was operating at a loss, though he seemed confident of the press' future, claiming that "the value of dissonance outweighs that of cents". He has been vocal on the economic realities facing independent publishing houses, as well as an advocate of the role they play in the development of literary communities. In the same article, O'Sullivan outlined his belief that Irish writing can come from many perspectives, and is simply "literature that is embedded in the very soul of our island".

Despite his profile as a digital publisher and scholar, O'Sullivan believes that print books have far greater "material and cultural importance" than digital formats, describing Kindle and iTunes as a "dangerous axis of power".

As a publisher, O'Sullivan has been critical of major literary competitions, particularly those which he deems to be under the influence of their commercial sponsors. He has called for "improved transparency" and "the removal of commercial influences" from literary competitions, arguing that "small publishers can't take risks on large entry fees if there is any doubt in their mind over how decisions are being made".

Writing

O'Sullivan's first collection of poetry, Kneeling on the Redwood Floor, was released by Lapwing Publications in 2011, a work which the author himself did not rate very highly. In 2014, Alba Publishing released his second collection, Groundwork, followed in 2017 by Courting Katie, published by Salmon Poetry. Reviewing Courting Katie, Dedalus poet Matthew Geden describes O'Sullivan as a "vibrant voice" that offers "timely reminders to look closer at the world around us". Writing in Poetry Ireland Review, Jessica Traynor likens O'Sullivan to a "latter-day Kavanagh" who "breathes life into deserted streets and grey city corners".

O'Sullivan's poetry has been published in a number of journals, magazines and periodicals, including The SHOp, Cyphers, Southword, and Crannóg.

In 2016, O'Sullivan was placed third in the Gregory O'Donoghue International Poetry Prize. He has twice been shortlisted for the Fish Poetry Prize, as well as the Fish Short Story Prize. He received a High Commendation in Munster Literature Centre Fool for Poetry 2014 International Chapbook Competition and 2013 Charles Macklin Poetry Prize.

O'Sullivan has contributed features and opinion pieces to a number of regional and national periodicals in Ireland and internationally, including The Guardian, the LA Review of Books, The Irish Times, and Cork Evening Echo.

Personal

O'Sullivan was born and raised in Cork city, Ireland, a place for which he has often expressed great affection, and featured in his work. He is the grandson of the performer Billa O'Connell. O'Sullivan attended Coláiste an Spioraid Naoimh, though did not enjoy his time at school. He is a graduate of Cork Institute of Technology, University College Cork, and University College Dublin.

In 2016, O'Sullivan is a supporter of the Cork Film Festival. He has been highly critical of the Catholic Church in Ireland.

Bibliography

References

1986 births
21st-century Irish male writers
Academics of University College Cork
Irish male short story writers
21st-century Irish short story writers
Living people
21st-century Irish poets
Irish male poets
Academics of the University of Sheffield